Nekrotronic (formerly Nekromancer) is a 2018 Australian comedy science-fiction horror film. It was co-written and directed by Kiah Roache-Turner, and stars Ben O'Toole and Monica Bellucci. It tells the story of demons that steal people's souls through smartphone apps, and the demon-hunters out to kill them.

It was intended to be a mashup of Ghostbusters, The Matrix, and The Exorcist. The story was inspired by the ICE of William Gibson's Neuromancer.

The film premiered at the 2018 Toronto International Film Festival. In September 2019, it had its Australian debut at the SciFi Film Festival in Sydney.

Cast
 Ben O'Toole as Howard North
 Monica Bellucci as Finnegan
 Caroline Ford as Molly
 Tess Haubrich as Torquel
 Bob Savea as Rangi
 David Wenham as Luther
 Goran D. Kleut as Lurch

Reception
The site's critical consensus reads, "Nekrotonic has plenty of oddball energy, but this horror-comedy hybrid mashes up ingredients without much of a clear idea of what to do with them." On Metacritic it has a score of 25% based on reviews from 4 critics, indicating "generally unfavorable reviews".

Dennis Harvey of Variety wrote: "Maximum energy meets zero originality to numbing effect in a horror-action-comedy mishmash."
Stephen Dalton of The Hollywood Reporter wrote: "This bloodthirsty comic-book fantasy is let down by its infantile humor and derivative, incoherent plot."

Accolades
The film was nominated for Best Hair and Makeup at the 9th AACTA Awards.

External links
 Nekrotronic on IMDb

References

Australian science fiction horror films
2018 films
2018 comedy horror films
2010s science fiction horror films
Australian comedy horror films
Australian supernatural horror films
Australian action horror films
Australian science fiction action films
Australian action comedy films
Demons in film
Entertainment One films
2018 comedy films
2010s exploitation films
Australian splatter films
2010s Australian films